Tao Jin or variant is the name of:

Surname "Tao", given name "Jin"
Tao Jin (actor) (1916–1986), Chinese actor
Tao Jin (footballer) (born 1985), Chinese association footballer

Given name "Tao", surname "Jin"
Jin Tao (director), a Chinese director; see Golden Eagle Award for Best Television Series Director (China)

See also

 Taojin (disambiguation)
 Tao (disambiguation)
 Jin (disambiguation)
 
 Jintao (given name)